The TEC Players Championship was a women's professional golf tournament on the Ladies European Tour (LET). The tournament was held annually between 1988 and 1990 at various venues in England.

Winners

Source:

References

External links
Ladies European Tour

Former Ladies European Tour events
Golf tournaments in England
Defunct sports competitions in England
Recurring sporting events established in 1988
Recurring sporting events disestablished in 1990